Carlos Vinícius Santos de Jesus (born 22 June 1994) is a Brazilian footballer who plays as a midfielder for Portuguese club Portimonense.

Club career
In July 2015, he joined Aarau on loan for one year. At the end of the loan period in June 2016, Aargau wanted to extend the deal by another year but the owning club Atlético Monte Azul instead reached an agreement with Thun for one-year loan deal.

On 16 July 2021, he joined Portimonense in Portugal on a two-year contract.

Honours
Standard Liège
 Belgian Cup: 2018

References

External links 
 

1994 births
Living people
Brazilian footballers
Association football wingers
2. Bundesliga players
Swiss Challenge League players
Swiss Super League players
Primeira Liga players
Belgian Pro League players
Desportivo Brasil players
Sport Club Internacional players
Bayer 04 Leverkusen players
SSV Jahn Regensburg players
Atlético Monte Azul players
FC Aarau players
FC Thun players
G.D. Estoril Praia players
Standard Liège players
Vitória F.C. players
Red Bull Brasil players
Guarani FC players
CR Vasco da Gama players
Portimonense S.C. players
Brazilian expatriate footballers
Expatriate footballers in Belgium
Brazilian expatriate sportspeople in Belgium
Expatriate footballers in Germany
Brazilian expatriate sportspeople in Germany
Expatriate footballers in Portugal
Brazilian expatriate sportspeople in Portugal
Expatriate footballers in Switzerland
Brazilian expatriate sportspeople in Switzerland